Michel Sala (born 13 May 1954) is an Algerian-born French trade unionist and politician of La France Insoumise who has been representing Gard's 5th constituency in the National Assembly since 2022.

See also 

 List of deputies of the 16th National Assembly of France

References 

Living people
1954 births
Deputies of the 16th National Assembly of the French Fifth Republic
21st-century French politicians
La France Insoumise politicians
Members of Parliament for Gard
People from Oran
Migrants from French Algeria to France
French people of Algerian descent
French trade unionists